The Bwende (also Babwende, Bweende, Babuende) are a Bantu people living in Lower Congo, southwest of Kinshasa on both side of the border for Kongo-Kinshasa and Kongo-Brazzaville. They mainly inhabit the area north of the Congo river, between the rivers Luala and Kenke. They speak Bwende, a Bantu language related to Kikongo and were a part of the Kongo Kingdom.

Art

Statuettes 
The artistic expression of the Bwende has been strongly influenced by the Beembe, their neighbors to the northwest. However, the Bwende statuettes have some specific characteristics, such as broad shoulders, numerous body scarifications and a hairstyle that is sometimes asymmetrical. Wooden statuette with scrap metal inserts were used in the nkisi cult. These fetishes are considered to be very powerful: they are asked to identify a culprit as well as to cure an illness.

Niombo 
The Bwende are famous for their large fabric funerary mannequins (niombo), in reality desiccated corpses swaddled in many layers of cloth. They are rarely seen in Western collections. However, in the Museum of World Culture in Gothenburg there is an impressive niombo, famous for its height, scope and reddish color. This was on display at the Eternal Ancestors: The Art of the Central African Reliquary exhibition held at the Metropolitan Museum. of Art in 2007. It was produced at the beginning of the 20th century in a Swedish mission in the Lower Congo.

Muziri 
As with the Beembe, there are small reliquary statues also made of fabric (muziri), which contain a few bones. Their size is between 40 and 80 cm. While beembe dolls are in a seated position, their bwende counterparts are depicted standing.

References 

This article is based on a translation of the equivalent article of the French Wikipedia

Ethnic groups in the Republic of the Congo
Ethnic groups in the Democratic Republic of the Congo